Ronald Mason is the name of:

R. A. K. Mason (1905–1971), New Zealand poet
Ronald Mason (cricket writer) (1912–2001), English writer of novels, biographies, literary criticism and cricket books
Ronald Mason (drama) (1926–1997), Northern Irish director and producer of drama for the BBC
Ron Mason (1940–2016), Canadian former ice hockey player, head coach and university executive
Ron G. Mason (1916–2009), British oceanographer